Filippino Lippi (April 1457 – 18 April 1504) was an Italian painter working in Florence, Italy during the later years of the Early Renaissance and first few years of the High Renaissance.

Biography
Filippino Lippi was born in Prato, Tuscany,  the illegitimate son of the painter Fra Filippo Lippi and Lucrezia Buti. Filippino first trained under his father. They moved to Spoleto, where Filippino served as workshop adjuvant in the construction of the Cathedral. When his father died in 1469, he completed the frescoes with Storie della Vergine (Histories of the Virgin) in the cathedral. Filippino Lippi completed his apprenticeship in the workshop of Botticelli, who had been a pupil of Filippino's father. In 1472 the records of the painters' guild record that Botticelli had only Filippino Lippi as an assistant.

His first works greatly resemble those of Botticelli, but with less sensitivity and subtlety. The very first ones (dating from 1475 onwards) were initially attributed to an anonymous "Amico di Sandro" ("Friend of Botticelli"). Eventually Lippi's style evolved into a more personal and effective one over the years 1480–1485. Works of the early period include: the Madonnas of Berlin, London and Washington, the Journeys of Tobia of the Galleria Sabauda, Turin, the Madonna of the Sea of Galleria dell'Accademia, Florence, and the Histories of Ester.

Together with Perugino, Ghirlandaio and Botticelli, Lippi worked on the frescoed decoration of Lorenzo de' Medici's villa at Spedaletto. On 31 December, 1482, he was commissioned to decorate a wall of the Sala dell'Udienza of Palazzo Vecchio in Florence, a work never begun. Soon after, probably in 1483–84, he was called to complete Masaccio's decoration of the Brancacci Chapel in the church of the Carmine, that had been left unfinished at the artist's death in 1428. Here he painted Stories of Saint Peter, in the following frescoes: Quarrel with Simon Magus in face of Nero, Resurrection of the Son of Teophilus, Saint Peter Jailed, Liberation and Crucifixion of Saint Peter.

Lippi's work on the Sala degli Otto di Pratica, in the Palazzo Vecchio, was completed on 20 February, 1486. It is now in the Uffizi Gallery. At about this time, Piero di Francesco del Pugliese asked him to paint the altarpiece with the Apparition of the Virgin to St. Bernard, which is now in the Badia Fiorentina, Florence. This is Lippi's most popular picture: a composition of unreal items, with its very particular elongated figures, backed by a phantasmagorical scenario of rocks and almost anthropomorphic trunks. The work is dated to 1485–1487.

Later, he worked for Tanai de' Nerli in Florence's Santo Spirito church.

On 21 April, 1487, Filippo Strozzi asked him to decorate the Strozzi family chapel in Santa Maria Novella with Stories of St. John Evangelist and St. Philip. He worked on this commission intermittently, over a long time. He only completed it in 1503, after Strozzi's death. The windows with musical themes, in the same chapel, also designed by Filippino, were completed between June and July 1503. These paintings can be seen as a mirror of the political and religious crisis in Florence  at the time: the theme of the fresco, the clash between Christianity and Paganism, was hotly debated in the Florence  of Girolamo Savonarola.

Filippino depicted his characters in a landscape which recreated the ancient world in its finest details, showing the influence of the Grottesco style he had seen on his time in Rome. In this way he created an "animated", mysterious, fantastic but disquieting style, showing the unreality of nightmare. Thus, Filippino portrayed ruthless executioners with the grimmest of faces, who raged against the Saints. In the scene of St. Philip expelling a monster from the temple, the statue of the pagan god is represented as a living figure which seems to dare the Christian saint.

In 1488, Lippi went to Rome, where Lorenzo de' Medici had advised Cardinal Oliviero Carafa to entrust him with the decoration of the family chapel in Santa Maria sopra Minerva. These frescoes show a new kind of inspiration, quite different from his earlier works, but confirm Lippi's continued research on the themes of the Ancient era. He finished the cycle by 1493.

Lippi's return to Florence took place—the date is disputed—at some time between 1491 and 1494. Works of this period include: Apparition of Christ to the Virgin (c. 1493, now in Munich), Adoration of the Magi (1496, for the church of San Donato in Scopeto, now in the Uffizi), Sacrifice of Laocoön (end of the century, for the villa of Lorenzo de' Medici at Poggio a Caiano), St. John Baptist and Maddalena (Valori Chapel in San Procolo, Florence, inspired to some way extent by Luca Signorelli's art).

He also worked outside the area of his home city, on the Certosa, or Chapterhouse, in Pavia and in Prato, where in 1503 he completed the Tabernacle of the Christmas Song, now in the City Museum; in 1501 Lippi painted the Mystic Wedding of St. Catherine for the Basilica of San Domenico in Bologna.

Lippi's final work was the  Deposition for the Santissima Annunziata church, Florence, which at his death in April 1504 was unfinished.

Because of Lippi's fame and reputation, on the day of his burial all the workshops of the city closed for him. Noted art critic Paul George Konody wrote of Lippi that "some of his qualities show him to be the most subtle psychologist of his time, the most modern in spirit of all the artists of the Renaissance".

Major works
 The Coronation of the Virgin (c. 1480)—Tempera on panel, 90.2 × 223 cm, National Gallery of Art, Washington, D.C. 
 Madonna with Child, St Anthony of Padua and a Friar (before 1480)—Tempera on wood, 57 × 41.5 cm, Museum of Fine Arts, Budapest 
 Tobias and the Angel (c. 1480)—Tempera on panel, 33 × 23 cm, National Gallery of Art, Washington, D.C.
 Portrait of an Old Man (1485)—Detached fresco, 47 × 38 cm, Uffizi, Florence
 Three Angels with Young Tobias (1485)—Oil on panel, 100 × 127 cm, Galleria Sabauda, Turin
 Self-Portrait—Detached fresco on flat tile, 50 × 31 cm, Uffizi, Florence
 Portrait of a Youth (c. 1485)—Wood, 51 × 35.5 cm, National Gallery of Art, Washington, D.C.
 Signoria Altarpiece (Pala degli Otto) (1486)—Tempera on wood, 355 × 255 cm, Uffizi, Florence
 Annunciation with St. Thomas and Cardinal Carafa (1488–1493)—Fresco, Santa Maria sopra Minerva, Rome
 Apparition of the Virgin to St. Bernard (1486)—Oil on panel, 210 × 195 cm, Church of Badia, Florence 
 Madonna with Child and Saints (c. 1488)—Oil on wood, Santo Spirito, Florence
 St. Jerome  (1490s)—Oil on wood, 136 × 71 cm, Uffizi, Florence
 Apparition of Christ to the Virgin (c. 1493)—Oil on panel, 156.1 × 146.7 cm, Alte Pinakothek, Munich
 Madonna and Child with Saints (1498)—affresco, 239 × 141 × 71 cm, Museo Civico, Prato
 Adoration of the Magi (1496)—Oil on wood, Uffizi, Florence
 Allegory (c. 1498)—Oil on wood, 29 × 22 cm, Uffizi, Florence
 Allegory of Music (Erato) (c. 1500)—Tempera on panel, 61 × 51 cm, Staatliche Museen, Berlin
 Crucifixion, c. 1501— tempera on panel, 31.2 × 23.4 cm, Museo Civico, Prato
 Mystic Marriage of St Catherine (c. 1501–1503)—Panel, Basilica di San Domenico, Bologna
 Madonna and Child, St. Stefan and St. John the Baptist (1502–1503)—tempera on panel, 132 × 118 cm, Museo Civico, Prato
 Deposition (1504, finished by Perugino in 1507)—Oil on panel, 333 × 218 cm, Gallerie dell'Accademia, Florence

School works
Following works are permitted to be cited as Filippino's school works.
 the Madonna, Child and St. John—tondo, Keglevich collection, Budapest,
 Cenacolo di S. Apollonia—Florence
 the Virgin giving her girdle to St. Thomas—Florence
 St. Anthony Abbot—Florence

Gallery

See also
 Brancacci Chapel
 Carafa Chapel
 Strozzi Chapel

Notes

References
 The Development of the Italian Schools of Painting, Volume 12, p. 371ff., Raimond van Marle, Hacker Art Books, New York 1970.

Further reading
 Paul George Konody, Filippino Lippi (George Newnes, Ltd., 1905).

Historical novels
 Linda Proud, A Tabernacle for the Sun (Godstow Press, 2005), a literary novel set in Florence during the Pazzi Conspiracy, adheres closely to known facts. Filippino features as the closest friend of the narrator, Tommaso dei Maffei, here and in the following two novels of The Botticelli Trilogy.
 Linda Proud, Pallas and the Centaur (Godstow Press, 2004), deals with the aftermath of the Pazzi Conspiracy and Lorenzo de' Medici's strained relations with his wife and with Poliziano.
 Linda Proud, The Rebirth of Venus (Godstow Press, 2008), the final volume of The Botticelli Trilogy, covers the 1490s and the death of Lorenzo.
 Linda Proud, A Gift for the Magus (Godstow Press, 2012), a novel about Fra Filippo Lippi and Cosimo de' Medici. Features Filippino's birth and childhood.

External links

 Exhibition Da Donatello a Lippi. Officina Pratese at Museo Civico di Palazzo Pretorio in Prato (September 2013 – January 2014)
 Works of Filippino Lippi at the Uffizi Gallery in Florence
 
 
Filippino Lippi at the National Gallery of Art

15th-century Italian painters
Italian male painters
16th-century Italian painters
Italian Renaissance painters
Painters from Tuscany
People from Prato
1450s births
1504 deaths
Catholic painters